This is a list of episodes from the fourth season of Cannon.

Broadcast history
The season originally aired Wednesdays at 9:00-10:00 pm (EST)

Episodes

Cannon (season 4)